Menumbok is a sub-district in the west of the Malaysian state of Sabah which is also one of the three administrative parts of Kuala Penyu District.

This town is also administered as a sub-district within the jurisdiction of the Kuala Penyu district and a minor port of the state of Sabah, which serves as the main gateway to the island of Labuan from the mainland.

See also 
 Labuan–Menumbok Bridge

External links 
  Menumbok Sub-district Office, Kuala Penyu

Kuala Penyu District
Populated places in Sabah